Jonathan R. Alger is an American academic and the current president of James Madison University. Alger became the university’s sixth president on July 1, 2012. Alger is the sixth president since the university’s founding in 1908. He was formally inaugurated on March 15, 2013.

Alger is also a scholar and speaker on higher education policy and law and currently co-teaches a seminar on leadership in the James Madison University Honors Program.

Education

Alger was a Phi Beta Kappa at Swarthmore College where he received his B.A. with high honors in political science with a history minor and a concentration in public policy. He earned his Juris Doctor with honors from Harvard Law School.

Career

Before becoming president at JMU, Alger was the senior vice president and general counsel at Rutgers University. Before working at Rutgers, Alger served as assistant general counsel at the University of Michigan, where he played a key role. In the university’s efforts in two landmark Supreme Court cases on diversity and admissions he coordinated one of the largest amicus brief coalitions in Supreme Court history. At both Rutgers and Michigan, he taught courses, seminars and independent studies in law, higher education and public policy. He has also taught interdisciplinary courses for graduate students in law, education, public policy and information.

Prior to his time at University of Michigan, he served as counsel for the American Association of University Professors, where he advised institutions on policies, procedures and cases on issues such as academic freedom, shared governance, tenure, due process and discrimination. Earlier in his career he served as attorney-advisor for the United States Department of Education's Office for Civil Rights. He also previously served as an associate in the law firm of Morgan, Lewis & Bockius.

Because of Alger’s background in civil rights law, he has been credited with understanding the intricacies of how the Office for Civil Rights interprets and enforces Title IX.

President Alger, while declining to comment on a specific assault case at the school, acknowledged that he was concerned about public perceptions of the school, and appeared in a video created by JMU to raise public awareness of the problem. He also promised in a letter to the university community that the institution would do everything in its power to help keep its students safe.

Boards, memberships and service

Current appointments:
Board Member, Division I Board of Directors for the National Collegiate Athletic Association

Past appointments:
President, Board of Directors of the National Association of College and University Attorneys
Board Member, The American Bar Association’s Accreditation Committee 
Board Member, The National Heart, Lung and Blood Institute's Advisory Council at the National Institutes of Health

Published works

Personal history and family
Alger was born and raised outside Rochester, N.Y. His wife, Mary Ann, has a B.S. from Auburn University and an M.B.A. from the University of Miami. The Algers have a daughter named Eleanor.

Alger has sung with acclaimed choral groups that have toured internationally, made professional recordings and performed on national television. Additionally, he used to play trombone.

References

Presidents of James Madison University
Living people
United States education law
Higher education law
Swarthmore College alumni
Harvard Law School alumni
Year of birth missing (living people)
University of Michigan people